Owned by International Multifoods, Inc.,  Boston Sea Party was a chain of seafood high-end restaurants that started around 1976 during the U.S. Bicentennial. This special occasion chain had a 1770s theme where waitresses wore floor length, colonial dress with  ruffled mop caps.  The menu consisted of an all you can eat  seafood buffet with an entree choice  of lobster, prime rib, New York strip steak or fish.   Most U.S. large convention cities enjoyed a Boston Sea Party.  In Atlanta, the restaurant was located within the  Buckhead community  in a historic farmhouse with decor consisting of beautiful stained glass windows (from a former church), wine cellar, and  one dining room with old, brick floors.  It is unclear when the chain finally closed for good, although articles seem to indicate the last restaurants open were in the late '90s or early 2000s. One of these articles, by the Houston Business Journal in December 1994, reports Christmas party deposits lost due to the abrupt closing of the Westheimer location the month before. A related posting, also under this BSP search, is a review of the Houston company, Epic Group. The 2000 posting updates the location as a Molinas restaurant.

See also
 List of seafood restaurants

References

External links
Boston Sea Party TV Commercial at The Museum of Classic Chicago Television

Defunct restaurant chains in the United States
Fast-food seafood restaurants
Defunct seafood restaurants in the United States